Robert "Bob" Braddy Field is a baseball venue in Jackson, Mississippi, United States.  It is home to the Jackson State Tigers baseball team of the NCAA Division I Southwestern Athletic Conference.  Originally known as Jackson State University Baseball Complex, it was renamed prior to the 2010 season for Jackson State athletic director Robert Braddy.  Opened in 2006, the facility has a capacity of 800 spectators.

In addition to Jackson State baseball, the field has hosted events of the Mississippi RBI (Reviving Baseball in Inner Cities) Program.

See also 
 List of NCAA Division I baseball venues

References 

College baseball venues in the United States
Baseball venues in Mississippi
Jackson State Tigers baseball
2006 establishments in Mississippi
Sports venues completed in 2006